Monsignor Fraser College (also called Monsignor Fraser, MFC, or Fraser) is a Roman Catholic specialized dual-track Alternative and Adult Secondary School run by the Toronto Catholic District School Board in Toronto, Ontario, Canada. The school was named in honour of John Andrew Mary Fraser' (1887-September 3, 1962), the founder of the Scarborough Foreign Mission Society and a missionary.

Msgr. Fraser College offers high school credits to three distinct age groups: 16 - 18 through the Alternative Program, 18 - 20 in the Adult Day School Program, and Over 21 through the Continuing Education Program. There are four main campuses throughout the city with an additional two dedicated to SAL (Supervised Alternative Learning) programs. Msgr. Fraser also offers a Transition To Work (T2W) Program for special needs students aged 18-20.

History 
The TCDSB recommended and approved the establishment of Monsignor Fraser College in 1975, in conjunction with Metropolitan Social Services, as a means of responding to the growing need for adult education programs for the Metro Toronto adult population.  The school has evolved over the years and at the present time, Monsignor Fraser College consists of multiple campuses offering a variety of programs to students aged 16 and over. 

Monsignor Fraser College is a quadmestered Catholic Secondary School, which welcomes adolescents, and adults of all faiths, who wish to complete their Ontario Secondary School Diploma or Certificate, to study English as a Second Language within a Diploma program, or to upgrade work skills. Organized with campuses in many different parts of the city, this school offers a safe and welcoming learning environment.

Monsignor John M. Fraser

Monsignor Fraser College is named in honour of the founder of the Scarborough Foreign Mission Society. Monsignor Fraser was born in Toronto but spent most of his younger years as a missionary outside of Canada. In 1918, he returned to Canada with the firm intention of establishing a foreign mission seminary.  Archbishop Gauthier of Ottawa approved the foundation of China Mission College at Almonte, Ontario, and the institution received the blessing and support of many of the Canadian hierarchy.

At Almonte, Father Fraser gathered about him, as did Christ Himself, twelve young apostles.  In October 1919, CHINA, the mission monthly publication, made its appearance.

At the suggestion of Archbishop McNeil, property was acquired in Scarborough and the senior students were transferred to this new house.  Father Fraser joined them soon after.  In 1924, St. Francis Xavier, China Mission Seminary was formally blessed and opened on the Scarborough Bluffs in Ontario.  The following year, Father Fraser headed the first departure group to the district of Lishui in Southern Chekiang, China.

Monsignor Fraser was noted for his drive for establishing the Kingdom of God and for his ready adaptability to new paths when familiar ones were cut off.

Programs

16-18 Program 
Developed to meet the needs of students who are experiencing difficulty achieving success at their present high school, this program offers students:

 A small, personalized environment
 An individualized program which meets students’ unique learning styles
 The opportunity to accumulate credits towards the completion of secondary school
 The ability to accelerate study in order to complete diploma requirements sooner than in a traditional school setting

18-20 Program 
Developed for students 18 – 20 years of age who wish to complete their secondary education in an adult education environment.  This program offers students:

 The opportunity to earn 2 full credits every 9 weeks (8 credits per year)
 A variety of multi-level course offerings
 4 Entry points annually
 A flexible learning environment

21+ Program 
This program is designed for adults over the age of 21 who still need to complete their secondary education or new Canadians who are seeking an Ontario Secondary School Diploma or Certificate, knowledge of the English language and/or a gateway to either the workplace or post-secondary school education.

Transition to Work Co-Operative Education Program (T2W) 
This program provides an opportunity for students with specific identified needs to explore the workplace with the assistance of job coaches and educational assistants. Students are prepared for the transition to the world of work and if required, to supported independent living.

Highlights 
Alternative Education (16-20) • Adult Day School (18-20) • Continuing Education (Over 21) • SWAC at George Brown, Seneca, and Humber Program • Flexible learning environment • Four entry points annually • A variety of multi-level courseoff erings • Various locations throughout the city.

See also

List of high schools in Ontario
Burnhamthorpe Collegiate Institute 
Scarborough Centre for Alternative Studies

References

External links
Monsignor Fraser College
Orientation Centre 

Catholic secondary schools in Ontario
High schools in Toronto
Educational institutions established in 1975
Toronto Catholic District School Board
1975 establishments in Ontario
Alternative education
Adult education